Garius or Garios was a town of ancient Paphlagonia, located 80 stadia to the east of Callistratia. It was inhabited during Roman and Byzantine eras.

Its site is located near Katırga in Asiatic Turkey.

References

Populated places in ancient Paphlagonia
Former populated places in Turkey
History of Kastamonu Province
Roman Paphlagonia
Roman towns and cities in Turkey
Populated places of the Byzantine Empire